The 1988 Special Honours in New Zealand was a Special Honours Lists, dated 6 February 1988, making the second five appointments to the Order of New Zealand.

Order of New Zealand (ONZ)
Ordinary member
 June Daphne, Lady Blundell .
 Walter James Knox .
 Emeritus Professor Douglas Gordon Lilburn
 Professor Richard Ellis Ford Matthews.
 Frederick Turnovsky .

References

Special honours
Special honours